Gerronema viridilucens is a species of agaric fungus in the family Marasmiaceae.  Found in South America, the mycelium and fruit bodies of the fungus are bioluminescent.

See also 
List of bioluminescent fungi

References

External links 

Marasmiaceae
Bioluminescent fungi
Fungi described in 2005
Fungi of South America